FitzSymond is a surname. Notable people with the surname include:

John FitzSymond  ( 1342– 1392), English politician
James FitzSymond, List of Lord Mayors of Dublin

See also
Fitzsimmons